Gaby Peñalba (also known as Gaby Peñalva Elzo) was a prolific Spanish film editor active from the 1940s through the 1980s.

Selected filmography 

 La llamada del sexo (1977)
 Fuzzy the Hero (1973)
 Kill Django... Kill First (1971)
 White Comanche (1969)
 The Glass Sphinx (1967) 
 Danger!! Death Ray (1967)
 The Big Gundown (1966)
 Malvaloca (1954)
 Nobody Will Know (1953)
 La alegre caravana (1953)
 ¡Che, qué loco! (1953)
 Violetas imperiales (1952)
 La niña de la venta (1951)
 La trinca del aire (1951)
 El último caballo (1950)
 La dama del armiño (1947)

References

External links 

 

Spanish women film editors
Spanish film editors